Epallage fatime, the Oriental damselfly, is a damselfly (Zygoptera) from the family of the Euphaeidae (oriental damselflies).

Features 
This is a strongly built damselfly, with a length of 40–50mm. Males are completely blue; only the top of the eyes and forehead are black. Females are yellowish white with dark markings. The abdomen segments have two long dark longitudinal spots on the top, giving the appearance of a narrow light stripe in the middle along the entire length of the abdomen. In specimens where the spots are smaller, this effect is less obvious.

It is the only damselfly in Europe to hold its wings straight out like a dragonfly. The length of the rear wing is 30–34mm. The pterostigma is long (the length of five cells below) and dark blue-grey in males, white or gray in females. In both males and females, the wing tip is usually dark from the pterostigma, but the size of that spot varies. In females, the base of the wings is often dark, but the size of that spot also shows great variation.

Behaviour 
Both males and females are frequently seen resting on stones or branches near flowing water. The flight season in Cyprus in from early March to late August.

Distribution 
The species occurs in Southeastern Europe, in particular Bulgaria, Greece, the islands of the Aegean Sea, Cyprus, Turkey and Israel, and further east to Kashmir.

References

 Askew, R.R. (2004) The Dragonflies of Europe. (revised ed.) Harley Books. p215. 
 Boudot JP., et al. (2009) Atlas of the Odonata of the Mediterranean and North Africa. Libellula Supplement 9:1-256.
 Dijkstra, K-D.B & Lewington, R. (2006) Field Guide to the Dragonflies of Britain and Europe. British Wildlife Publishing. 
 Smallshire, Dave & Swash, Andy (2020) Europe’s Dragonflies. Princeton University Press 
 Sparrow, David J; Sparrow, Rosalyn & De Knijf, Geert, in: Sparrow, David J. and John, Eddie (Eds.) (2016) An Introduction to the Wildlife of Cyprus. Terra Cypria. 

Damselflies of Europe
Euphaeidae
Insects described in 1840